The Mongolian and Tibetan Cultural Center is a cultural center in Da'an District, Taipei, Taiwan under the administration of the Ministry of Culture. It was previously under the Mongolian and Tibetan Affairs Commission of the Executive Yuan, which in 2017 had its duties absorbed into the Ministry of Culture and the Mainland Affairs Council's Department of Hong Kong, Macao, Inner Mongolia, and Tibet Affairs.

History
The ROC government established the cultural center at the residence of the 7th Changkya Khutukhtu Lobsang Pelden Tenpe Dronme in February 1993.

Objectives
The center has the following objectives:

 Promote the Mongolian and Tibetan cultures
 Increase people's understanding of the Mongolian and Tibetan peoples
 Advance Mongolian and Tibetan academic standards

Facilities
The center has the following facilities:

First and second floor
 Exhibition area for cultural artifacts

Third and fourth floor
 Reading room
 Lecture hall
 Conference room
 Memorial prayer hall for the 7th Changkya Khutukhtu

Transportation
The center is accessible within walking distance east from Guting Station of the Taipei Metro.

See also
 List of museums in Taiwan
 List of tourist attractions in Taiwan
 Mongolian and Tibetan Affairs Commission
 Mongolians in Taiwan

References

1993 establishments in Taiwan
Cultural centers in Taipei
Mongolian culture
Mongolian diaspora in Asia
Tibetan culture
Tibetan diaspora in Asia